Reed McNeil Izatt (born October 10, 1926) is an American chemist who is emeritus Charles E. Maw Professor of Chemistry at Brigham Young University in Provo, Utah. His field of research was macrocyclic chemistry and metal separation technologies.

Early life and education
Izatt was born in Logan, Utah on October 10, 1926. His first ten years were spent on a ranch in Sumpter Valley, Oregon where he attended school in a two-room schoolhouse. He developed an interest in geology and astronomy. His family then returned to Logan, Utah and he graduated from Logan High School in 1944. On 6 June 1944, Izatt enrolled at Utah State Agricultural College (now Utah State University).

In 1945 and 1946, Izatt served in the United States Army and from 1947 to 1949, he was a missionary in the United Kingdom for the Church of Jesus Christ of Latter-day Saints. While stationed at Fort Douglas, Izatt studied at the University of Utah and in 1951, he received a bachelor of science in chemistry. Izatt took post graduate studies in chemistry at Pennsylvania State University. He was mentored by W. Conard Fernelius and in 1954 received a  doctorate degree.

Career 
Izatt worked at the Mellon Institute for Industrial Research (now part of Carnegie Mellon University) for two years before taking a faculty position in the department of chemistry at Brigham Young University (BYU). He retired from BYU in 1993 as the Charles E. Maw Professor of Chemistry. Izatt and James J. Christensen, a chemical engineer, founded a thermochemical institute at BYU to promote and facilitate interdisciplinary research.

Awards
Izatt is a fellow of the American Association for the Advancement of Science (1982). He was the BYU Annual Faculty Lecture in 1970. Izatt received the Utah Award (1971) (Salt Lake Section, American Chemical Society); the Huffman Award (1983) (Calorimetry Conference); the American Chemical Society Separations Science and Technology Award (1996); the Utah Governor's Medal for Science and Technology (1990); and the First Annual Alumni Achievement Award (2001) (Utah State University Department of Chemistry and Biochemistry).

ISI Ranking 
Reed M. Izatt's number in the ISI rankings is 68.

Scientific work
Izatt and his colleagues, James J. Christensen and John L. Oscarson constructed and used a variety of novel high precision calorimeters to study a number of host and guest chemical systems of both academic and commercial interest. Izatts thermodynamic results have been used in the development of macrocyclic and supramolecular chemistry, molecular recognition, heats of mixing, nucleic acid chemistry, metal cyanide chemistry,<ref>Izatt, R. et al Thermodynamics of metal cyanide co-ordination. Part VII. Log K, ΔHo, and ΔSo values for the interaction of CN− with Pd2+. ΔHo values for the interaction of Cl−  and Br−with Pd2+. J. Chem Soc. (A) 1967 pp1304-1308.</ref> chemical separations, amino acid microspecies formation,Zhang, X. et al Thermodynamics of macroscopic and microscopic proton ionization from protonated 4-aminobenzoic acid in aqueous solution from 298.15 to 393.15 K. J. Phys. Chem. B 2000 vol 104 pp8598-8605. and high- temperature corrosion chemistry,Oscarson, J. et al A model incorporating ion dissociation, solute concentration, and solution density effects to describe the thermodynamics of aqueous sodium chloride solutions in the critical region of water. Ind. Eng. Chem. Res. 2004 vol 43 pp7635-7646.

Macrocyclic chemistry
Izatt and Christensen made the first extensive thermodynamic study using titration calorimetry of the highly selective metal complexation properties of metal-cyclic polyether interactions.Izatt, R. et al A calorimetric study of the interaction in aqueous solution of several uni- and bivalent metal ions with the cyclic polyether dicyclohexyl-18-Crown-6 at 10, 25, and 40 °C. J. Am. Chem. Soc. 1971 vol 93 pp1619-1623. This work was followed by research correlating metal ion selectivity to macrocycle structure in a variety of solvents using a range of metal ions and organic amine cations.

Using chiral macrocycles and chiral alkylammonium salts, Izatt and his colleagues were the first to establish host–guest chiral recognition in a given system by more than one experimental method (temperature-dependent 1HNMR spectroscopy in CD2Cl2, titration calorimetry in methanol, and selective crystallization) and to report K, ΔH, and ΔS values for the interactions, thus quantitating the reactions.Davidson, R. et al. Enantiomeric recognition of organic ammonium salts by chiral crown ethers based on the pyridino-18-Crown-6 structure. J. Org. Chem. 1984 vol 49 pp353-357. Subsequent x- ray crystallographic results provided a structural basis for the recognition.

Use of fluorophores appended to macrocycles provides advantages over other techniques for selective and sensitive metal ion detection. Izatt demonstrated that certain 8-¬hydroxyquinoline derivatives attached to diazamacrocycles elicit a strong fluorescent response when complexed to selected closed-shell metal ions. That is, Hg2+, [[Cd2+]], [[Zn2+]] and [[Mg2+]].  The novelty of this work lies in the high-fluorescent selectivity these ligands possess for the indicated metal ions in the presence of competing metal ions. The work presents the possibility of producing novel supported sensor systems capable of metal detection. In principle, detection limits could be well below parts per trillion (ng/mL). This level of detection coupled with the high metal ion selectivity imparted by the macrocyclic ligand could make these systems valuable in detecting target metal ions in environmental chemistry and as a means of continuously monitoring target metal ion concentrations in industrial streams.

Separations chemistry
Izatt and his colleagues were the first to attach macrocycles to a solid matrix and make highly selective metal separations.Bradshaw, J. et al. Preparation of silica gel bound macrocycles and their cation binding properties. J. Chem. Soc., Chem. Commun. 1988 pp812-814 This achievement resulted in the establishment of IBC Advanced Technologies, Inc. (IBC) which commercialized the discovery.

Legacy

Commercialization of research results
In the 1960s, Izatt and Christensen developed high-precision titration calorimeters capable of simultaneously measuring equilibrium constants and heats for chemical reactions rapidly and with precision. These calorimeters were marketed worldwide through TRONAC, a chemical instrumentation company located in Provo, Utah. This calorimeter line was later acquired by TA Instruments.

In 1988, IBC Advanced Technologies, Incorporated (IBC) was founded in Provo, Utah by Izatt, Bradshaw and Christensen. IBC commercialized work in chemical separations using an environmentally safe process based on molecular recognition technology (MRT).Izatt, N. et al Contributions of Professor Reed M. Izatt to molecular recognition technology: from laboratory to commercial application. Ind. Eng. Chem. Res. 2000 Vol 39 pp3405-3411 The MRT process enables the rapid and highly selective separation of metals from solutions even in the presence of complex matrices consisting of high concentrations of competing metals and high concentrations of acids or bases. This technology is important in the purification of precious, rare, and base metals during the refining process as well as in the recovery of these metals from spent products such as catalysts and electronics.Izatt, S. et al Status of metal separation and recovery in the mining industry. JOM 2012 vol 64 pp1279-1284.van Deventer, J., Selected ion exchange applications in the hydrometallurgical industry. Solv. Extrac. Ion Exch. 2011 Vol 29 pp695-718. IBC's MRT products are effective in the remediation of radioactive waste, selectively separating and concentrating radionuclides such as Cs, Sr, Tc, and Ra.Dulanská, S. Pre-concentration and determination of  90Sr in radioactive wastes using solid phase extraction techniques. J. Radioanal. Nucl. Chem. 2011 Vol 288 pp705-708.Bond A. et al Metal ion separation and preconcentration; progress and opportunities. ACS Symposium Series 716, American Chemical Society, Washington, D.C.,  Chapter 17, pp251-259. In addition, IBC's MRT products are used for analytical sample preparation and determination of metals, including toxic metals and radionuclides.Paučová, V. et al A Comparison of extraction chromatography TEVA Resin and MRT AnaLig TC-02 Methods for 99Tc Determination. J. Radioanal. Nucl. Chem. 2012 Vol 293 pp309-312.Rahman, I. et al Selective separation of tri- and pentavalent arsenic in aqueous matrix with a macrocycle-immobilized solid-phase extraction system. Water, Air, & Soil Pollution. 2013 Vol 224 pp.1–11.

 International macrocyclic chemistry symposia
In 1977, Izatt and Christensen organized the first Symposium on Macrocylic Compounds in Provo, Utah. In 1985, this and related symposia were incorporated into the International Symposium on Macrocyclic Chemistry (ISMC)''. In 2006, ISMC was expanded to include supramolecular chemistry and the name was changed to International Symposium on Macrocyclic and Supramolecular Chemistry (ISMSC).

International Izatt-Christensen award
Since 1991, the International Izatt-Christensen award is presented annually at the ISMC (until 2005) and ISMSC (from 2006) meetings.  The award recognizes excellence in macrocyclic and supramolecular chemistry and is regarded as the highest international award in these areas.  Recipients include:

 Jean-Pierre Sauvage (1991)
 Eiichi Kimura (1992)
 J. Fraser Stoddart (1993)
 Daryle H. Busch (1994)
 David N. Reinhoudt (1995)
 George W. Gokel (1996)
 Alan M. Sargeson (1997)
 Seiji Shinkai (1998)
 Fritz Vögtle (1999)
 Jerry L. Atwood (2000)
 Jonathan Sessler (2001)
 David Gutsche (2002)
 Jeremy Sanders (2003)
 Makoto Fujita (2004)
 Kenneth Raymond (2005)
 Roeland Nolte (2006)
 David Leigh (2007)
 Akira Harada (2008)
 Omar M. Yaghi (2009)
 Luigi Fabbrizzi (2010)
 Andrew D. Hamilton (2011)
 Kimoon Kim (2012)
 Eric V. Anslyn (2013)
 Mir Wais Hosseini (2014)
 Paul D. Beer (2015)
 Hanadi Sleiman (2016)
 Harry L. Anderson (2017)
 Philip A. Gale (2018)
 Luisa De Cola (2019)
 Mitsuhiko Shionoya (2020)
 Ivan Huc (2021)
 Jonathan Nitschke (2022)
 Sijbren Otto (2023)

Endowed Reed M. Izatt and James J. Christensen awards
In 2007, Izatt created an endowment at Brigham Young University to reward faculty excellence in research in the Department of Chemistry and Biochemistry and in the Department of Chemical Engineering, and to provide funds to invite an eminent scientist or engineer from the worldwide community to present two lectures to the combined Departments of Chemistry and Biochemistry, and Chemical Engineering, one more universal in nature for the general public and the second more technical in nature for faculty and students. Recipients of the Reed M. Izatt Faculty Excellence in Research Award in Chemistry include:
 Milton L. Lee (2008)
 Paul B. Savage (2010)
 Adam T. Woolley (2012)
The Reed M. Izatt and James J. Christensen lecturers include:
 J. Fraser Stoddart (15–16 November 2007)
 Gabor A. Somorjai (21–22 January 2009)
 George M. Whitesides (3–4 November 2009)
 Robert Byron Bird (17–18 November 2010)
 Richard N. Zare (7–8 February 2012)
 Robert Langer (6–7 February 2013)
 Mario Capecchi (23–24 January 2014)
 Alexis T. Bell (19 March 2015)
 R. Graham Cooks (20-21 March 2017)
 Franklin Orr (19-20 October 2017)
 Geraldine L. Richmond (26-27 February 2019)
 Thomas F. Edgar (19-20 February 2020)
 Juan J. de Pablo (16 February 2023)

References

External links 
 Reed M. Izatt Brigham Young University.
 Annual Reed M. Izatt and James J. Christensen Lecture. Brigham Young University.
 Reed M. Izatt Publication List and Presentations List. Brigham Young University.
 Dr. Reed M. Izatt Receives 2010 Special Recognition Award. Brigham Young University.
 Reed Izatt Recognized at Alumni Dinner 2012. Brigham Young University.
 Reed M. Izatt Research Papers, circa 1960-1977. Brigham Young University.
 BYU Alumni Award Brigham Young University.
 Awards Calorimetry Conference.org. 2013. 
 De Groote M. 20 researchers at Utah universities are ranked among most cited Deseret News.com.
 IBC. 
 ISMSC Brigham Young University.
 ACS Award recipients. ACS.org.
 AAAS Fellows. AAAS.org
 USU Alumni Achievement Award. USU.edu
 Utah Governor's Medal for Science. Deseret News.com 14 April 1990.
 ISI H-Factor number 68. RSC.org. 
 Reed Izatt Graduate Fellowship in Chemistry in memory of Dr. W. Conard Fernelius, Department Head from 1949 to 1960. PSU.edu.
 Reed M. Izatt papers, MSS 6245 at L. Tom Perry Special Collections, Brigham Young University

1926 births
Living people
21st-century American chemists
Brigham Young University faculty
Utah State University alumni
Scientists from Logan, Utah
Fellows of the American Association for the Advancement of Science
Carnegie Mellon University fellows
People from Sumpter, Oregon
Latter Day Saints from Utah
Latter Day Saints from Oregon
American Mormon missionaries in the United Kingdom
University of Utah alumni
United States Army personnel of World War II